State Highway 61 (SH 61) is a  state highway in northeastern Colorado. SH 61's southern terminus is at U.S. Route 34 (US 34) in Otis, and the northern terminus is at US 6 in Sterling.

Route description
SH 61 begins at an at-grade intersection with US 34 at the south side of Otis. It begins straight northward through town, in which roads are laid out in a grid-like pattern. The road then exits the town, entering sparsely populated wilderness. Near the Washington - Logan county line, the road abruptly turns westward and eastward again, crossing the boundary a few miles later. It then meets its northern terminus at US 6 east of Sterling. Interstate 76 (I-76) is accessed by following US 6 west from the northern terminus.

History
The road was established in the 1920s, when it connected US 36 near Cope to US 38 (former) near Sterling. When US 38 was moved around 1930, the terminus was redefined as SH 154, which took its place. The section from its current terminus at Otis to US 36 was deleted and the northern terminus was adjusted to US 6, which later became I-76, in 1954. The route was entirely paved three years later.

Major intersections

References

External links

061
Transportation in Washington County, Colorado
Transportation in Logan County, Colorado